Rusce may refer to:

 Rusce (Bujanovac), a village in Serbia
 Rusce (Vranje), a village in Serbia